Leo Amberg (23 March 1912 – 18 September 1999) was a Swiss professional road bicycle racer. He is most known for his bronze medal in the 1938 UCI Road World Championships. He was the Swiss National Road Race champion in 1937 and 1938. He also rode in the 1947 Tour de France.

Major results

1935
 1st Mont Faron
 2nd Overall Tour de Suisse
 5th Road race, UCI Road World Championships
1936
 3rd Overall Tour de Suisse
 8th Overall Tour de France
1937
 1st  Road race, National Road Championships
 1st Züri-Metzgete
 2nd Overall Tour de Suisse
1st Stages 1, 2 & 6
 3rd Overall Tour de France
1st Stages 5c & 19b (ITT)
1938
 1st  Road race, National Road Championships
 3rd  Road race, UCI Road World Championships
 1st Stage 18a Giro d'Italia
1939
 1st Stage 16 Deutschland Tour
 4th Züri-Metzgete
 10th Overall Tour de Suisse
1942 
 5th Züri-Metzgete
1943 
 10th Züri-Metzgete
1946
 9th Züri-Metzgete

References

External links 

Official Tour de France results for Leo Amberg

1912 births
1999 deaths
People from Hochdorf District
Swiss male cyclists
Swiss Tour de France stage winners
Swiss Giro d'Italia stage winners
Tour de Suisse stage winners
Sportspeople from the canton of Lucerne